Zeynalu (also Romanized as Zeynālū) is a village in Chaharduli Rural District, Keshavarz District, Shahin Dezh County, West Azerbaijan Province, Iran. At the 2006 census, its population was 142, in 28 families.

References 

Populated places in Shahin Dezh County